The Best of The Call is a compilation album released by American rock band The Call. The album was released in the United States on July 8, 1997, by WEA (Now Warner Music Group), the music arm of Warner Bros. The album includes songs spanning the group's career, as well as two new tracks and solo tracks from Been.

Track listing

Personnel

The Call
Michael Been – Guitar, Bass guitar, Organ, Vocals, Producer
Tom Ferrier – Guitar, Vocals
Scott Musick – Percussion, Drums
Jim Goodwin – Horn, Keyboard, Vocals
Greg Freeman – Bass guitar

Additional personnel
Bruce Cockburn - Guitar
Peter Gabriel – Background vocals
Jim Keltner – Drums
Bono – Background vocals
Garth Hudson – Keyboard
Joel Jaffe – Sound engineer
Pat Johnson – Photography
Jim Kerr – Background vocals
Daniel Presley – Producer
Dan Russell – Compilation producer
Don Smith – Producer
Eli Braden – Guitar
Thom Jurek – Liner notes
Jeremy Kunz – Guitar
Ralph Patlan – Guitar
Danny Horrid – Mastering
Bill Winn – Mastering
Elvis Wilson – Design
Barry Landis – Executive Producer

Release history

Reception

References

1997 compilation albums
The Call (band) albums